Hatane or Hatne is a village in the Palghar district of Maharashtra, India. It is located in the Vikramgad taluka. The Revera Institute of Medical Science and Research is located here.

Demographics 

According to the 2011 census of India, Hatane has 145 households. The effective literacy rate (i.e. the literacy rate of population excluding children aged 6 and below) is 70.45%.

References 

Villages in Vikramgad taluka